Chris Kasabach has served the Executive Director of the Watson Foundation since 2011, and is a member of the Foundation's board. He previously co-founded Sandbox Advanced Development with three Carnegie Mellon alumni, and together they co-founded and grew the company into BodyMedia Inc., a wearable health technology pioneer that was acquired by Jawbone for $100 million in 2013. He also currently serves on the board of directors at the Winterhouse Institute, a council of national design education. Previously, he received his BFA from Carnegie Mellon and an MPA from the Harvard Kennedy School, where he was named Lucius N. Littauer Fellow.

Design Awards 
Chris Kasabach's work has won several design awards, including two International Design Excellence Awards. His work has been exhibited by the Cooper Hewitt Smithsonian Design Museum. He was also a recipient of the Watson Fellowship in 1991, from the foundation he would later direct.

References

Living people
Carnegie Mellon University alumni
Harvard Kennedy School alumni
Year of birth missing (living people)
Place of birth missing (living people)
Nationality missing